The Battle of Vittsjö was a battle between Sweden and Denmark-Norway that took place in 1612; it was more a case of the Swedes fleeing the Danes than a full-scale battle.

Gustavus Adolphus, who in December 1611 at the age of 17, had ascended the throne of Sweden, was in the winter of 1612 on the rampage in Skåne in retaliation for the Danish ravaging of Småland and Västergötland during the Kalmar War. He and his army, which consisted of about 3 000 men, led by Nils Stiernsköld and Herman Wrangel, had burned the city of Vä and 24 parishes within Göinge and Villands district.

On the night of 10–11 February 1612 the king and a small force were in Vittsjö.  In the morning, the Danes attacked and the king and his entourage fled north past Vittsjö sconce towards Dragsån (now Verumsån or Vieån). The bridge over the river was held by Danes so the king was forced to try to cross by riding over the ice. The ice broke and the king and his horse fell into the water. The king (but not his horse) was rescued by the horsemen Thomas Larsson and Per Banér, who himself got into the water and was rescued by his younger brother Nils Banér.

In 1912 a memorial was raised to commemorate the battle. The inscription on the memorial reads in full:

"Minne af konung Gustaf II Adolfs räddning i Wittsjö den 11 februari 1612 af ryttaren Thomas Larsson" (in English "Memory of King Gustavus Adolphus' rescue in Wittsjö February 11, 1612 by the horseman Thomas Larsson")

Those who died in the action were buried in a mass grave. It was long forgotten, but was recovered as a result of the digging of a trench in 1959 not more than 100 meters from the previously-raised memorial stone.

Sources 
 Slaget i Vittsjö 1612. Author Ebbe Persson
 Kriget mot Danmark. Author Stefan Zenker

References

Conflicts in 1612
1612 in Denmark
Kalmar War
Vittsjö
Vittsjö